Bryoxiphium is the only genus of moss in family Bryoxiphiaceae, described as a genus in 1869.

Bryoxiphium is native to North America, East Asia, and certain islands in the North Atlantic.

Species
 Bryoxiphium madeirense A. Löve & D. Löve - Madeira
 Bryoxiphium mexicanum Besch. - Mexico (Jalisco, Distrito Federal, Morelos, Puebla, Veracruz)
 Bryoxiphium norvegicum (Bridel) Mitten - United States (incl Alaska), Greenland, Iceland, Mexico, Dominican Republic, China, Japan, Korea, Russian Far East

References

Bryopsida
Moss genera
Taxonomy articles created by Polbot